Conus vezzaroi is a species of sea snail, a marine gastropod mollusk in the family Conidae, the cone snails, cone shells or cones.

These snails are predatory and venomous. They are capable of "stinging" humans.

Description
The length of the shell varies between 40 mm and 70 mm.

Distribution
This marine species of cone snail occurs off the Philippines.

References

 Cossignani T. (2016). Pionoconus vezzaroi (Gastropoda: Prosobranchia: Conidae) nuova specie dalle Filippine. Malacologia Mostra Mondiale. 93: 28

vezzaroi
Gastropods described in 2016